Dermot Devery is an Irish former hurler who played as a right wing-forward for the Offaly senior team.

Born in Banagher, County Offaly, Devery first played competitive hurling in his youth. He made his senior debut with Offaly during the 1979-80 National League. During his brief career he experienced little success.

At club level Devery is a one-time Leinster medallist with St Rynagh's. He also won numerous championship medals with the club.

Honours
St Rynagh's
Leinster Senior Club Hurling Championship (1): 1982

References

Living people
St Rynagh's hurlers
Offaly inter-county hurlers
Year of birth missing (living people)